Julia Avita Mamaea or Julia Mamaea (14 or 29 August around 182 – 235) was a Syrian noble woman and member of the Severan dynasty. She was the mother of Roman emperor Alexander Severus and remained one of his chief advisors throughout his reign. She was killed in 235 by rebel soldiers alongside her son.

Family

Julia Avita Mamaea was the second daughter of Julia Maesa, a powerful Roman woman of Syrian origin, and Syrian noble Gaius Julius Avitus Alexianus. She was a niece of empress Julia Domna, emperor Lucius Septimius Severus, and sister of Julia Soaemias Bassiana. She was born and raised in Emesa (modern Homs, Syria), where her family was very powerful.

Julia's first husband was an unknown former consul who died. Her only undisputed child, Severus Alexander, whom she gave birth to on October 1, 208 in Arca Caesarea, may have been from this marriage instead of her second as Dio claimed. She then married her second husband, a Syrian Promagistrate named Marcus Julius Gessius Marcianus from Arca Caesarea (Arqa in Lebanon). She may have had a son named Marcus Julius Gessius Bassianus and a daughter named Theoclia with him.

When her cousin, emperor Caracalla, was killed near Carrhae, Macrinus proclaimed himself emperor. Mamaea's mother Maesa and sister Soaemias organized a revolt against Macrinus to declare Soaemias' son, Varius Avitus Bassianus (Elagabalus), as emperor. As a response, Macrinus's camp killed a number of individuals with connections to Elagabalus, including Mamaea's husband Gessius, around 218. Julia provided education of her son Alexander, before his becoming emperor of Rome. Alexander thought much of his mother's advice and followed what she told him to do.

Reign of Elagabalus (218-222)

As a member of the imperial Roman family, under the authority of her aunt Julia Domna, she closely watched the death of her cousin Caracalla and the ascension of her nephew Elagabalus: the oldest grandson of Julia Maesa and initially, her favorite. When Elagabalus successfully overthrew Macrinus and reigned as emperor, Mamaea and her son are described as being present at the imperial court, where her mother Julia Maesa and sister Julia Soaemias, the mother of Elagabalus, also lived. Due to his unorthodox behavior, Elagabalus and Julia Soaemias alienated the Praetorian Guard and their favor instead fell on Alexander, Mamaea's son. Mamaea distributed gold to the Praetorians to usher up support for her son, and guarded him against plots devised by the increasingly desperate Elagabalus. Elagabalus' continued machinations against Alexander spurred Praetorians to murder Elagabalus, and Alexander became emperor in 222.

The reign of Alexander

Julia Mamaea and her mother Maesa played an instrumental role in the imperial accession of Alexander, then 13 years old, by securing the Praetorians' loyalty to him. They remained influential figures during his reign. Julia Mamaea attained the title Augusta immediately following his acquisition of the throne. When Maesa died in 224, Mamaea took over the state affairs alongside an advisory board.

The two women had collaborated in choosing 16 distinguished senators to form this advisory board and relied heavily on the lawyer Ulpian, who was also from Syria. This created a court environment in which the advisory board ran the Roman Empire with Alexander as the mere figurehead. The new regime garnered the approval of surviving historical sources for overturning Elagabalus' measures and reinstating a more traditional form of government. Ulpian, who held influence during Alexander's early reign, was made head of the Praetorian Guard. However, he was unable to control the Praetorians, who eventually rebelled. Despite the swift flight to the palace under the protection of Julia Mamaea and Severus Alexander, Ulpian was murdered around 223 or 228.

Upon reaching adulthood, Alexander confirmed his esteem for his mother and listened to her advice. She accompanied her son in his campaigns, and like her aunt Julia Domna, she too held many titles in addition to Augusta: mater augusti nostri et castrorum et senatus et patriae ("mother of the emperor, the camp, the senate and the country") and mater universi generis humani ("mother of the all humanity"). The historian Herodian and text Historia Augusta characterize Alexander as a mama's boy who never managed to escape her maternal domination but that he resented her love of money. Mamaea's influence over him led some sources to call him Alexander Mamaeae. Though she was credited with her son's principled upbringing and the stability during his early reign, Alexander's military shortcomings were attributed to Mamaea by the army and ancient historians. By preventing his exposure to battles as a protective measure, Mamaea may have contributed to her son's deteriorating relationship with the army.

According to Herodian, Julia had become jealous of her daughter-in-law, Sallustia Orbiana, whom Alexander married in 225, and whose father Seius Sallustius had been possibly made caesar, because she disapproved that there was another Augusta. Julia Mamaea had Barbia expelled from the palace and had her father executed, against the will of Alexander Severus, because his mother had too much influence over him and he obeyed all her orders. However, the same historian conflictingly credits Julia for selecting Sallustia Orbiana as an Augusta. The downfall of Orbiana's father, a result of his hostile relation with Mamaea, and the murder of Ulpian are two episodes which demonstrate the prevalence of political intrigues in Alexander's early reign. 

Julia called on Origen, the Alexandrian Christian leader, to provide her with instructions in Christian doctrine.

Death 
After an inconclusive expedition to repel a Persian invasion in 232, Julia Mamaea and Alexander went north to deal with a German attack. Alexander alienated the Rhine legions by his lack of military prowess and his inflexibility towards pay demands, leading to the troops proclaiming Maximinus Thrax emperor in 235. The army also blamed Mamaea for Alexander's passiveness and stinginess. On March 21st, troops sent to kill Alexander found him clinging to Mamaea in a tent, where he is said to have been blaming her for his upcoming death. The mother and son were murdered together, ending the Severan dynasty. The following regime placed them under damnatio memoriae.

Buried together, the sarcophagus of Mamaea and Alexander was found within the Monte Del Grano by excavators, and later installed in 1590 to the courtyard of the Palazzo Dei Conservatori. Today, the sarcophagus can be found in the Capitoline Museums in Rome.

Severan dynasty family tree

See also
Women in Ancient Rome
Severan dynasty family tree

References

External links

Julia Mamaea's article at livius.org

2nd-century births
Year of birth uncertain
235 deaths
Severan dynasty
Emesene dynasty
Mamaea, Avita
3rd-century women rulers
2nd-century Roman women
3rd-century Roman women
3rd-century executions
People executed by the Roman Empire
Ancient Roman women in warfare
Augustae
Executed ancient Roman women
Murdered Roman women